Mysteries is an album by jazz pianist Keith Jarrett recorded in two sessions in December 1975. Originally released by Impulse! in 1976, it features performances by Jarrett's 'American Quartet' of saxophonist Dewey Redman, bassist Charlie Haden and drummer Paul Motian, along with percussionist Guilherme Franco. These December, 1975 sessions also produced the album Shades.

The album was included in the 1996 four disc Mysteries: The Impulse Years 1975-1976, a box-set  which also included Shades and Jarrett's two final albums for Impulse!, Byablue and Bop-Be.

In October 2011 Shades was reissued with Mysteries in a single disc format titled Mysteries / Shades, as part of the Impulse! 2-on-1 series.

Background: American Quartet's last sessions (Dec. 1975-Oct. 1976) 
From Neil Tesser's extensive liner notes to the compilation album Mysteries: The Impulse Years 1975-1976:

Reception 
The AllMusic review by Richard S. Ginell awarded the album four stars out of five, but at the same time said:

On the positive camp, writing for jazz.com Ted Gioia gave the track "Everything that Lives Laments" a rating of 95/100 and praised it:

Track listing 
All compositions by Keith Jarrett.
 "Rotation" – 11:03
 "Everything that Lives Laments" – 10:04
 "Flame" – 6:10  
 "Mysteries" – 15:22

Personnel 
 Keith Jarrett – piano, Pakistani flute, wood drums, percussion
 Dewey Redman – tenor saxophone, maracas, tambourine, Chinese musette, percussion
 Charlie Haden – bass
 Paul Motian – drums, percussion
 Guilherme Franco – percussion

Production
 Esmond Edwards – producer 
 Tony May – recording engineer
 Tom Wilkes – art director
 Kendun Recorders – mixing and mastering
 Keith Jarrett –  cover photograph

References

External links 

Keith Jarrett albums
Impulse! Records albums
1976 albums
Albums produced by Esmond Edwards